Daniel Bonifacius von Haneberg (16 June 1816 in Tanne near Kempten – 31 May 1876 in Speyer) was a German Catholic bishop and orientalist.

Early studies and career
He began his classical course at Kempten, where he pursued the studies prescribed by the curriculum, and mastered several Oriental languages (Hebrew, Arabic, Syriac, Persian, and Ethiopic). He next went to Munich, where he completed his elementary studies in the gymnasium, and followed the courses of philosophy and theology in the university.

While a theological student, he cultivated Sanskrit and Chinese over and above the Oriental languages with which he was already acquainted, translated a few works of Cardinal Wiseman, contributed several essays and poems to various German periodicals, and prepared for the Catholic priesthood. He took his degree of Doctor of Theology at the University of Munich in 1839, and was ordained priest at Augsburg, on 29 August of the same year.

The following November he qualified for a Privatdozent in the University of Munich by his thesis "De significationibus in Veteri Testamento præter literam valentibus" (Munich, 1839), and began in December his career of thirty-three years as a lecturer of the Old Testament. In 1841, he became extraordinary professor of Hebrew and of Holy Scripture in the same university, and in 1844 ordinary professor. His lectures, wherein he displayed a solid learning, a constant discretion, and a deep piety, were attended with great profit and delight by an increasing number of students not only from Bavaria, but also from the other German States, and soon caused him to be regarded as one of the most prominent Catholic professors of his day.

He carried out the duties of his priestly calling, such as preaching, attendance at the confessional, answers to sick-calls, etc. His learning and still more his virtues, secured for him great favor at the Bavarian court, and he acted as tutor in the families of the Duke Maxmilian and Prince Leopold.

In 1850, he joined the Order of St. Benedict, and a few years afterwards (1854) was chosen abbot of the Benedictine monastery of St. Boniface at Munich. He soon founded the Reform School at Andechs in Upper Bavaria, and a little he tried, but with small success, to establish missions of his order in Algiers and in the Orient.

As bishop
At the approach of the Vatican Council he was invited by Pope Pius IX to share in the labours preparatory to that assembly. After the dogma of papal infallibility had been solemnly proclaimed by the Council (18 July 1870), and publicly accepted by the German Bishops assembled at Fulda, (end of August, 1870), Hanneberg humbly gave up his former views concerning this point of doctrine, and sincerely submitted to the authority of the Church.

From 1864 onwards, several episcopal sees had been offered him, but he had declined them all. At length, however, on his presentation by the King of Bavaria for the Bishopric of Spires and at the instance of the Sovereign Pontiff, the humble abbot accepted that see, and was consecrated 25 August 1872. His zeal and success in the government of this diocese fully justified his selection for the episcopal dignity. In days of opposition to Catholicism in Germany — the days of the framing and application of the Falk Laws (1872-1875) — he fought against the encroachments of the civil power on the ecclesiastical jurisdiction. He also strenuously, though not always successfully, combated the influence of the Old Catholics of the time. He was most unsparing of himself in his confirmation tours, although the bodily fatigues thus entailed were far too much for his failing strength. After a few days of sickness he succumbed (31 May 1876) to pneumonia, which he had contracted in one of those episcopal tours, and was lamented by both clergy and people who revered him as a saint.

Works
Haneberg was a distinguished and prolific writer. During the years 1840 and 1841 he worked on his "Die religiösen Alterthümer der Hebrüer", and in 1844 he published his "Einleitung in das Alte Testament" as a text-book for his lectures. In the course of time, he recast both these works, the former of which passed to the second edition in 1869 under the title of "Die religiösen Alterthümer der Bibel", and the latter of which appeared rewritten as "Geschichte der biblischen Offenbarung," and was rendered into French by Isadore Goschler (Paris, 1856), reaching a fourth edition in 1876.

Besides these, his best-known works, he published several others which were chiefly the fruit of his Hebrew and Arabic studies, and formed his contribution to the Journal of the Oriental Society and to the transactions of the Bavarian Academy of Sciences of which he became a member in 1848. Among these latter works the following may be mentioned:

"Ueberdie arabische Psalmenübersetzung des Saadia" 
"Uber das Schulwesen der Mohammedaner" 
"Erörerungen über Bendo-Wakidi's Geschichte der Eroberung von Syrien" 
"Ueber die Theologie des Aristotles" 
"Canones S. Hippolyti arabice e codicibus romanis cum versione latinâ, annotationibus, et prolegomenis."

He found time also for contributing articles to the Kirchenlexicon of Wetzer and Weite.

References

1816 births
1876 deaths
People from Oberallgäu
Roman Catholic bishops of Speyer
German orientalists
German Benedictines
19th-century German Roman Catholic bishops
German male non-fiction writers
Deaths from pneumonia in Germany